H2R may refer to:
 BMW H2R, a hydrogen-powered car
 Harris Hill Raceway, a race track in Texas
 H2R Productions, an American production company
 Kawasaki H2R, racing version of the three cylinder two-stroke H2 Mach IV motorcycle
 Kawasaki Ninja H2R, a supercharged four cylinder four-stroke motorcycle